Shahzad Noor (born 21 June 1989) is a Pakistani fashion model and actor.

Personal life
Noor was born into a Pashtun family in Karachi, Pakistan, and he explains that, for his acting career, he had to rectify his Urdu accent.

Career
He had his own printing press before being spotted by the famous stylist Khawar Riaz, who pushed him towards professional modelling, and he eventually won two "Best Model Male" awards at the 12th Lux Style Awards and 14th Lux Style Awards, respectively. He also received three consecutive nominations at Hum Awards as "Best Model Male", winning two, in 2015 and 2016, while he also won the same award in the inaugural Hum Style Awards, also in 2016. In 2017 he was nominated during the 16th Lux Style Awards.

In 2015, Noor marked his screen debut with Geo TV's Tera Mera Rishta.

Television

Awards and nominations

References

External links
 
 
 

Living people
Pakistani male models
Pakistani male television actors
21st-century Pakistani male actors
Pakistani male singers
Pashtun people
Male actors from Karachi
1987 births